James Harold Flower (1907–1979) was an Australian rugby league footballer who played in the 1930s.  Jim 'Pansy' Flower was the brother of Harry Flower who was also a St. George first grade player and NSW rep.

Playing career
Flower came through the St. George juniors and made his first grade debut on 28 June 1930 in round 6.  Flower was in the squad for the 1930 NSWRL Final against Western Suburbs but did not play.  St George had won the initial final but due to the rules at the time, Wests were allowed to challenge for a rematch as they had finished as minor premiers.  St George lost the replay 27–2 at the Sydney Sports Ground, Flower was injured for the match and was replaced by Alf Sadler. 

After playing another season at St. George, Flower moved to Walcha, New South Wales as captain/coach in 1932 and then to Mudgee, New South Wales as captain/coach in 1933, and then the North Sydney club in 1934 for one season.

He returned to the St. George club in 1935 to see out his career. In 1937 he was appointed Third Grade captain/coach before retiring.  Jim Flower remained at Saints for many years on the Football committee.

Death
Flower died on 16 December 1979.

References

St. George Dragons players
North Sydney Bears players
1907 births
1979 deaths
Australian rugby league players
Rugby league halfbacks
Rugby league five-eighths
Rugby league players from Sydney